"Happier" (stylized in lowercase) is a song written and recorded by American singer-songwriter Olivia Rodrigo, seen as the eighth track on Rodrigo's debut studio album Sour, which was released on May 21, 2021 through Geffen Records. The song was produced by Dan Nigro. According to Rodrigo, this song is inspired by the song ''Perfect'' by ''Ed Sheeran'' in both the lyrics and the instrumental track. 

Musically, "Happier" is a folk-pop piano ballad, over a deep bass production. The lyrics of the song details the struggles of moving on from a break-up while selfishly wishing their former partner to be less happy with their new relationship. The song received critical acclaim from music critics upon the release of Sour, with many naming it as one of the album's best songs and highlights.

Background 
"Happier" was released as one of the eleven songs from Olivia Rodrigo's debut album, Sour. The song is one of the few songs Rodrigo previewed as a demo on Instagram and caught the attention of Nigro, who produced the song, to make it onto the album. On April 1, 2021, Rodrigo announced that her debut album was set to be released on May 21, 2021. On April 13, Rodrigo announced that the album is titled Sour. Alongside the album name announcement, the track listing was also revealed. "Happier" appears as the eighth track of the album. The song was released on May 21, 2021, alongside its parent album, with an accompanying lyric video released on Rodrigo's YouTube channel.

Composition 

"Happier" is a piano-led folk-pop ballad, with a deep bass production. Rodrigo wrote this song with Ed Sheeran in 2020, with production by Dan Nigro and Sheeran himself. It has a total duration of two minutes and 55 seconds. The song's lyrics speak of "dealing with the flawed narrative of female rivalry" while selfishly wishing her ex-partner and new love a happy future, not just as happy as when they were still together, with the lyrics "I hope you're happy, but don't be happier." According to the score published in Musicnotes.com by Sony Music Publishing, the song is written in the key of G♭ major with a tempo of 56 beats per minute. It is set in 68 times, and Rodrigo's voice ranges from G♭3 to D♭6.

Critical reception 
Chris Willman from Variety named "Happier" as the "best song" of the album, and stated that the song has a "clever-but-real lyrical twist". P. Claire Dodson of Teen Vogue, described the song as one of the "strongest" among the songs written by Rodrigo.  Rolling Stone critic Angie Martoccio said that the song is "one of the [album]'s sparkly highlights".

Commercial performance
In the United States, following the release of Sour, "Happier" debuted within the Billboard Hot 100 at number 15, alongside the 10 other tracks from the album. The following week, the song fell five places to number 20. The song also debuted at number 14 on the Billboard Global 200 chart. "Happier" charted in both Australia and Canada at number 15, and New Zealand at number 14. In the United Kingdom, the song failed to chart within the official UK Singles Chart, but it did on the UK Streaming Chart at number 18. Elsewhere, "Happier" charted within the top 40 in Greece, Norway, and Portugal, at numbers 29, 28, and 19, respectively.

Credits and personnel
Credits adapted from Tidal and the liner notes of Sour.

Recording
 Recorded at Amusement Studios (Los Angeles)
 Mixed at SOTA Studios (Los Angeles)
 Mastered at Sterling Sound (New York City)

Personnel

 Olivia Rodrigo – vocals, backing vocals, songwriter
 Daniel Nigro – producer, backing vocals, recording engineer, piano, bass, drums, synth, guitar
 Paul Cartwright – viola, violin
 Kathleen – backing vocals
 Dan Viafore – assistant engineer
 Mitch McCarthy – mixing engineer 
 Randy Merrill – mastering engineer

Charts

Weekly charts

Year-end charts

Certifications

References

2020s ballads
2021 songs
American folk songs
Folk ballads
Olivia Rodrigo songs
Pop ballads
Song recordings produced by Dan Nigro
Songs written by Olivia Rodrigo